The Shadow Ministry of Andrew Peacock was the opposition Coalition shadow ministry of Australia from 16 March 1983 to 5 September 1985, opposing Bob Hawke's Labor government.

The shadow ministry is a group of senior opposition spokespeople who form an alternative ministry to the government's, whose members shadow or mark each individual Minister or portfolio of the Government.

Andrew Peacock became Leader of the Opposition upon his election as leader of the Liberal Party of Australia on 11 March 1983 and appointed a new Shadow Ministry.

First arrangement
The following were members of the Shadow Ministry:

Second arrangement
The Shadow Ministry was reshuffled on 14 December 1984 following the 1984 Australian federal election.

See also
 Fourth Fraser Ministry
 Shadow Ministry of John Howard
 First Hawke Ministry
 Second Hawke Ministry

References

Liberal Party of Australia
National Party of Australia
Peacock I
Opposition of Australia
1983 establishments in Australia
1985 disestablishments in Australia